The Westmeath Senior Football Championship is an annual Gaelic Athletic Association competition organised by Westmeath GAA between the top Gaelic football clubs in County Westmeath. The winner of the Westmeath Championship qualifies to represent the county in the Leinster Senior Club Football Championship, the winner of which progresses to the All-Ireland Senior Club Football Championship. The current champions are  The Downs GAA, winning their 10th title in 2022.

Current senior teams
The 12 teams that competed in the 2018 Westmeath Senior Football Championship were:

Group 1: St Loman's, Killucan, Athlone, The Downs, Coralstown Kinnegad, Tyrellspass

Group 2: Garrycastle, Mullingar Shamrocks, Castledaly, Maryland GAA, St Mary's Rochfortbridge , Rosemount

St Mary's Rochfortbridge gained promotion to the senior championship as a reward for their 2017 Westmeath Intermediate Football Championship victory, while Caulry were relegated to the intermediate championship after three seasons in the top flight.

Top winners

List of finals

References

External links
Official Westmeath Website
Westmeath on Hoganstand

 
1
Senior Gaelic football county championships